The Nias-class was a class of four colonial schroefstoomschepen 4e klasse (gunboats) built by Huygens en van Gelder in Amsterdam and Koninklijke Maatschappij de Schelde in Flushing for the Royal Netherlands Navy. The class comprised Nias, Mataram, Edi and Serdang.

Description
The main armaments of the ships were two  single guns and one  gun. Nias carried three  guns instead of the two  the others had. The ship had a complement of 97 men.

Construction

Service history
All ships were meant to serve in the Dutch East Indies.

Nias
Nias was laid down in 1894 at the shipyard of Huygens en van Gelder at Amsterdam and launched in 1895. She began service in the Dutch East Indies in 1896.
In February 1902 she was tasked with the defense of a newly built settlement at Merauke in New Guinea.
In 1907 she was moved to subsidiary duties.

Mataram
Mataram was laid down in 1895 at the shipyard of Huygens en van Gelder at Amsterdam and launched in 1896. She began service in the Dutch East Indies in 1897.
In 1916 she was moved to subsidiary duties and served as instruction vessel for the newly found Kweekschool voor Inlandse Schepelingen in Makassar.

Edi
Edi was laid down in 1896 at the shipyard of Koninklijke Maatschappij de Schelde at Flushing and launched in 1897. She began service in the Dutch East Indies in 1897.
In 1910 she was moved to subsidiary duties.

Serdang
Serdang was laid down in 1896 at the shipyard of Koninklijke Maatschappij de Schelde at Flushing and launched in 1897. She began service in the Dutch East Indies in 1897.
In November 1904 she followed the Russian fleet that was steaming for Japan as it passed east of Sumatra.
On 11 September 1905 the ship took part in an expeditions to South Celebes. The ships where engaged in operations against the lord of Loewoe. An infantry battalion and a marine landing party were set ashore near Palope and later that day the soldiers and marines took the lord's palace.
Serdang was in 1921 converted into a minelayer and in 1932 into a torpedo repair ship. She eventually scuttled during World War II off Surabaya on 6 March 1942.

Notes

References
Koloniaal verslag van 1898 (Bijlage C 5.4)

19th-century naval ships of the Netherlands
Gunboat classes